The Pac-12 Conference Softball Player of the Year is a college softball award given to the Pac-12 Conference's most outstanding player. The award was first given following the 1987 season, with both pitchers and position players eligible. After the 1999 season, the Pac-12 Conference Softball Pitcher of the Year award was created to honor the most outstanding pitcher. The conference was known as the Pacific-10 before becoming the Pac-12 in 2011.

Key

Winners

Winners by school

References

Awards established in 1987
Player
NCAA Division I softball conference players of the year